Johann Dick (16 October 1883 – 18 May 1944) was an Austrian footballer. He played in two matches for the Austria national football team from 1903 to 1904.

References

External links
 
 

1883 births
1944 deaths
Austrian footballers
Austria international footballers
Place of birth missing
Association football midfielders
First Vienna FC players